Wanora is a rural locality in the Somerset Region, Queensland, Australia.

References

External links

Suburbs of Somerset Region
Localities in Queensland